The Rhünda, also called the Rhündabach, is a  long, eastern tributary of the River Schwalm in the Schwalm-Eder-Kreis, North Hesse, Germany.

Course 

The Rhünda rises in the northern foothills of the Knüllgebirge.

Initially the Rhünda flows northeastward through Sipperhausen and then after turns away from the Stöpplingskopf, towards north-northwest. In this direction it flows through, approximately parallel to the Bundesautobahn 7 to the east, Ostheim, then flows west past the Geschellenberg hill and then just to the east of the town of Mosheim.

The river meets a small stream close to Hilgershausen then flows southwest down to Helmshausen. There it opens into the River Schwalm, which, in turn, just after passing again under the railway line, flows in the River Eder.

Tributaries 

The tributaries of the Rhünda are all, orographically, on the left. They are:

 Hohlgraben, between Ostheim and Mosheim, length , basin size 
 Tiefenbach, between Hilgershausen and Helmshausen, length , basin size )
 Frasenbach, at Helmshausen

Rhünda Skull 

In 1956, a severe storm caused the Rhünda to wash away its bank near the town of Rhünda, close to the present-day sports area.
About  down a villager found a 12,000 years-old skull of a human, now known as The Rhünda Skull.

See also
List of rivers of Hesse

References

Rivers of Hesse
Rivers of Germany